List of NCAA basketball champions may refer to:

List of NCAA Division I men's basketball champions
List of NCAA Division I women's basketball champions
List of NCAA Philippines basketball champions

See also
NCAA basketball tournament (disambiguation)